Jennifer Koppelman Hutt (born February 7, 1970) is an American radio host, television host, author and lawyer.

Career
From 2005 to 2011, Hutt co-hosted Whatever with Alexis and Jennifer, a daily radio talk show on SiriusXM with Alexis Stewart. In September 2010, Whatever with Alexis and Jennifer became an hour-long television program on Hallmark Channel. Since 2012, Hutt has hosted her own radio show on SiriusXM called Just Jenny. In 2010 she began co-hosting the Jon Hein TV Show, also on SiriusXM.

Hutt has appeared on or hosted several television shows including HLN’s Showbiz Tonight, CNN Newsroom with Brooke Baldwin, and CBS's The Talk. For several months in 2013 and 2014, she co-hosted on HLN's Dr. Drew On Call.

In 2011, Hutt co-authored a book titled Whateverland with Alexis Stewart, daughter of Martha Stewart.

Personal life
Hutt, the daughter of producer and media executive Charles Koppelman and Bunny Koppelman, was born in 1970 in Roslyn Harbor. In 1997, Jennifer married Keith Hutt in New York. She holds a baccalaureate degree from Tufts University and a J.D. degree from Hofstra University, and has been a licensed lawyer in the state of New York since 2000. Her brother is Brian Koppelman, co-writer of Ocean's Thirteen and Rounders and her sister is Stacy Fritz.

References

1970 births
Living people
Tufts University alumni
Maurice A. Deane School of Law alumni
New York (state) lawyers
American women lawyers
American television hosts
20th-century American Jews
Writers from New York (state)
People from Roslyn Harbor, New York
American women television presenters
21st-century American Jews
20th-century American women
21st-century American women